Antti Kalevi Hyry (20 October 1931 in Kuivaniemi – 4 June 2016 in Espoo) was a Finnish writer and recipient of the Eino Leino Prize in 2005. In 2009 his book Uuni (Oven) won the Finlandia Prize, Finland's premier prize for literature. It details a man's reflections as he collects cement and bricks to build an oven for his home. Antti Hyry was married to Maija Hyry.

References

1931 births
2016 deaths
People from Ii
Finnish writers
Writers from Northern Ostrobothnia
Recipients of the Eino Leino Prize
Finlandia Prize winners